The 1996 Canoe Slalom World Cup was a series of five races in 4 canoeing and kayaking categories organized by the International Canoe Federation (ICF). It was the 9th edition. The series consisted of 4 regular world cup races and the world cup final.

Calendar

Final standings 

The winner of each world cup race was awarded 25 points. The points scale reached down to 1 point for 15th place. Only the best two results of each athlete from the first 4 world cups plus the result from the world cup final counted for the final world cup standings. If two or more athletes or boats were equal on points, the ranking was determined by their positions in the world cup final.

Results

World Cup Race 1 

The first world cup race of the season took place at the Ocoee Whitewater Center, Tennessee from 19 to 21 April.

World Cup Race 2 

The second world cup race of the season took place at the Segre Olympic Park in La Seu d'Urgell, Spain from 8 to 9 June.

World Cup Race 3 

The third world cup race of the season took place at the Augsburg Eiskanal, Germany from 15 to 16 June.

World Cup Race 4 

The fourth world cup race of the season took place at the Prague-Troja Canoeing Centre, Czech Republic from 24 to 25 August.

World Cup Final 

The final world cup race of the season took place in Três Coroas, Brazil from 23 to 29 September.

References

External links 
 International Canoe Federation

Canoe Slalom World Cup
1996 in canoeing